Platycypha lacustris is a species of damselfly in the family Chlorocyphidae. It is found in Cameroon, the Democratic Republic of the Congo, Kenya, Tanzania, Uganda, and Zambia. Its natural habitats are subtropical or tropical moist lowland forests and rivers. It is threatened by habitat loss.

References

Chlorocyphidae
Insects described in 1914
Taxonomy articles created by Polbot